This is a sortable table of the approximately 1,852 townlands in County Monaghan, Ireland.

Duplicate names occur where there is more than one townland with the same name in the county. Names marked in bold typeface are towns and villages, and the word Town appears for those entries in the Acres column.

Townland list

References

 
Monaghan
Monaghan
Townlands